Hemiptocha argentosa is a moth in the family Crambidae. It was described by Snellen in 1893. It is found in Argentina.

References

Chiloini
Moths described in 1893